Márkó Sós (born 29 December 1990) is a Hungarian football (midfielder) player who currently plays for Gyirmót SE.

References 
HLSZ 
MLSZ 
Honvédfc.hu

1990 births
Living people
Footballers from Budapest
Hungarian footballers
Association football defenders
Budapest Honvéd FC players
Budapest Honvéd FC II players
Rákospalotai EAC footballers
Kecskeméti TE players
Gyirmót FC Győr players
Nemzeti Bajnokság I players